Edgar Cantero (born 27 May 1981 in Barcelona) is a Spanish writer and cartoonist working in Catalan, Spanish and English. He is known for his books Dormir amb Winona Ryder, which won the 2007 Joan Crexells Award and the horror-comedy novel Meddling Kids (2017), which became a New York Times best-seller.

Bibliography

Novels

Catalan
Dormir amb Winona Ryder ("Sleeping with Winona Ryder" – 2007)
Vallvi (2011)

English
The Supernatural Enhancements (English, 2014)
Meddling Kids (English, 2017)
This Body's Not Big Enough for Both of Us (English, 2018)

Novellas

Catalan
Baileys n'coke (2008)
Dies delenda (2008)

Short stories

Catalan
 "El nexe entre el sexe i el plexe venós dorsal" (2005)
 "L'urinari d'Hesíode" (2005). English translation, "Aesop's Urinal", published in Best European Fiction 2016, 2015.
 "20/XX" (2006)
 "Tres nadons" (2007)
 "Un cadàver bonic" (2013)

English
 "There's a Giant Trapdoor Spider Under Your Bed" (2018)
 "The Meddler" (2018), a spin-off set in the aftermath of Meddling Kids.

References

External links
 

Living people
1981 births
Catalan-language writers
Spanish cartoonists
Writers from Catalonia
Writers from Barcelona
Spanish male novelists
21st-century Spanish novelists
21st-century Spanish male writers